Kōsuke Itō may refer to:
 Kosuke Ito (politician)
 Kōsuke Itō (baseball)